Ayskaya (Äy) is a rural locality (a village) in Turnalinsky Selsoviet, Salavatsky District, Bashkortostan, Russia. The population was 207 as of 2010. There are 3 streets.

Geography 
Ayskaya is located 38 km northeast of Maloyaz (the district's administrative centre) by road. Turnaly and Kadyrovo are the nearest rural localities.

References 

Rural localities in Salavatsky District